Judy Catherine Claire Parfitt (born 7 November 1935) is an English theatre, film and television actress. She made her film debut in the 1950s, followed by a supporting role in the BBC television serial David Copperfield (1966). She also appeared as Queen Gertrude in Tony Richardson's 1969 film adaptation of Hamlet.

Later credits include as Vera Donovan in the film adaptation of Stephen King's Dolores Claiborne (1995), and in Girl with a Pearl Earring (2003), the latter for which she earned a BAFTA nomination for Best Supporting Actress. She has been a cast member on the drama series Call the Midwife, playing Sister Monica Joan, since the show's launch in 2012.

Early life 
Parfitt was born in Sheffield, West Riding of Yorkshire in 1935 to Catherine Josephine (née Caulton) and Lawrence Hamilton Parfitt. As a teenager, she attended Notre Dame High School for Girls and later trained at the Royal Academy of Dramatic Art, graduating in 1953.

Career 
Parfitt began her career in theatre in 1954, appearing in a production of Fools Rush In at the Amersham Repertory Company.

In 1968, she appeared in the Hammer television film Journey to The Unknown, opposite Joseph Cotten and hosted by Joan Crawford. In 1978, Parfitt appeared opposite Laurence Olivier, Joan Plowright and Frank Finlay in the episode "Saturday, Sunday, Monday" of Laurence Olivier Presents. In 1981 she created the role of Eleanor in the Royal Shakespeare Company's production of Peter Nichols' Passion Play. In 1984 she played Deidre in Jack Rosenthal's The Chain. In 1987, she appeared in Maurice.

Two of her most notable past roles are Mildred Layton in The Jewel in the Crown (1984; for which she received her first BAFTA nomination) and Lady Catherine de Bourgh in the 1980 TV serial version of Pride and Prejudice. In 1995, she portrayed Kathy Bates' former, domineering employer in Dolores Claiborne, who is dying in present-time, but is seen as a vibrant, glowing woman in flashback sequences.

She has appeared in some American television shows, beginning with her regular role as Snow White's Stepmother, Evil Queen Lillian "Lily" White in the series The Charmings. Parfitt's real-life husband Tony Steedman guest-starred as Santa Claus in The Charmings' second season Christmas special. She appeared on an episode of Murder, She Wrote in 1989, and as the mother of Dr Elizabeth Corday (played by Alex Kingston) on several episodes of ER in 2002. In 1998, she played the role of Queen Marie in Ever After: A Cinderella Story.

Parfitt played Lady Mount-Temple in the biopic film Wilde, alongside Stephen Fry, Vanessa Redgrave and Gemma Jones in 1997. In 2003, she played Maria Thins in Girl with a Pearl Earring, which earned her a BAFTA nomination for Best Actress in a Supporting Role.

She played the domineering American dowager, Mrs van Schuyler, opposite David Suchet, James Fox, Frances de la Tour and David Soul in a feature-length episode of Agatha Christie's Poirot in the 2004 edition of Death on the Nile. In 2008, she appeared as the primary villainess in Little Dorrit, as the cruel Mrs Clennam, alongside Alun Armstrong, Sue Johnston and Matthew Macfadyen. At Christmas 2011, she appeared in a small role similar to that which she portrayed in Little Dorrit as Aunt Chastity along with Una Stubbs and Phyllida Law in The Bleak Old Shop of Stuff.

In 2012, she began appearing in the BBC TV series Call the Midwife as Sister Monica Joan, an elderly nun in early stages of dementia. Sister Monica Joan's strong educational background and knowledge of classical literature are often used in the programme as a way of reflecting on the unfolding drama. 

Parfitt has also recently appeared in BBC's spy tale, The Game; a film, Hello Carter; a Radio 4 show, Tom Wrigglesworth's Hang-Ups; and Jessica Hynes's suffragette sitcom Up the Women.

Personal life 
In 1963, Parfitt married actor Tony Steedman in Harrow, Middlesex. He died in 2001. The couple had one child, a son, David.

Filmography

Film

Television

Awards and nominations 
BAFTA Film Awards
2003 – Best Actress in a Supporting Role – as Maria Thins in Girl with a Pearl Earring – nominated
BAFTA TV Awards
1984 – Best TV Actress – as Mildred Layton in The Jewel in the Crown – nominated

Other awards
2009 – Satellite Award for Best Actress in a Supporting Role in a Series, Mini-Series or Motion Picture Made for Television – as Mrs Clennam in Little Dorrit – nominated
2014 – Satellite Award for Best Actress in a Supporting Role in a Series, Mini-Series or Motion Picture Made for Television – as Sister Monica Joan in Call the Midwife – nominated

References

Works cited

External links 
 

1935 births
20th-century English actresses
21st-century English actresses
Actresses from Yorkshire
Alumni of RADA
English film actresses
English stage actresses
English television actresses
Living people
Actresses from Sheffield
People educated at Notre Dame High School, Sheffield